C4 is the third solo mixtape by American rapper Kendrick Lamar, then known as "K.Dot". It was released on January 30, 2009 through Top Dawg Entertainment (TDE).

The mixtape contains 17 tracks and includes guest appearances from Lamar's TDE label-mates Ab-Soul, Punch, Jay Rock, ScHoolboy Q, and BO. 

The mixtape was heavily inspired by fellow American rapper Lil Wayne’s 2008 critically acclaimed album, Tha Carter III (C3), being mostly composed of freestyles over instrumentals from Wayne’s album in addition to a couple of original tracks.

Track listing

Notes

 "Best Rapper Under 25" is a remix of "3 Peat" by Lil Wayne.
 "Mr. Carter 2 (New Wayne Verse)" is a remix of "Mr. Carter" by Lil Wayne and Jay-Z.
 "A Milli" is a remix of "A Milli" by Lil Wayne.
 "Bitch I'm In the Club" is a remix of "Got Money" by Lil Wayne and T-Pain.
 "West Coast Wu Tang" samples "After Laughter (Comes Tears)" by Wendy Rene and interpolates "Bring the Pain" by Method Man and "Method Man" by Wu-Tang Clan.
 "Phone Home" is a remix of "Phone Home" by Lil Wayne.
 "Compton Chemistry" is a remix of "Dr. Carter" by Lil Wayne.
 "Take Off Your Pants" is a remix of "Tie My Hands" by Lil Wayne and Robin Thicke.
 "Shot Down" is a remix of "Shoot Me Down" by Lil Wayne.
 "Play with Fire" is a remix of "Playing with Fire" by Lil Wayne and Betty Wright.
 "Friend of Mine" samples "I Just Wanna Love U (Give it 2 Me)" by Jay-Z and Pharrell Williams.
 "Still Hustlin" is a remix of La La by Lil Wayne, Brisco, and Busta Rhymes.
 "Welcome to C4" is a remix of "You Ain't Got Nuthin" by Lil Wayne, Fabolous, and Juelz Santana.
 "G Code" is a remix of "Let the Beat Build" by Lil Wayne.
 "Famous Pipe Game" is a remix of "Mrs. Officer" by Lil Wayne, Bobby V, and Kidd Kidd.
 "Misunderstood" is a remix of "DontGetIt" by Lil Wayne.
 "Young & Black" samples "99 Problems" by Jay-Z.

References 

2010 mixtape albums
Kendrick Lamar albums
Top Dawg Entertainment albums
Albums produced by Sounwave